Submodalities is the fourth and most recent studio album by Canadian pop rock group the Moffatts. The album debuted at No. 8 on the Canadian Albums Chart and went platinum, assisted by their No. 1 hit single "Bang Bang Boom". The album was produced by Bob Rock.

Track listing

B - Sides

Chart positions

Year-end charts

Sales and certifications

References

2000 albums
Capitol Records albums
EMI Records albums
The Moffatts albums
Albums produced by Bob Rock